Meiners is a surname. Notable people with the surname include:

Christoph Meiners (1747–1810), German philosopher and historian
Ernst Meiners (1893–1959), German Wehrmacht general
Maarten Meiners (born 1992), Dutch alpine skier
Terry Meiners (born 1957), American radio and television personality